
Gmina Nowogródek Pomorski is a rural gmina (administrative district) in Myślibórz County, West Pomeranian Voivodeship, in north-western Poland.

The gmina contains part of the protected area called Barlinek-Gorzów Landscape Park.

Villages
Gmina Nowogródek Pomorski contains the villages and settlements of Chocień, Giżyn, Golin, Karlin, Karsko, Kinice, Kolonia Nowogródek Pomorski, Ławin, Lipin, Pachocino, Parzeńsko, Rataje, Rokitno, Smolary, Smólsko, Sołacz, Somin, Stawno, Sumiak, Świątki, Trzciniec, Trzcinna and Ulejno.

Neighbouring gminas
Gmina Nowogródek Pomorski is bordered by the gminas of Barlinek, Kłodawa, Lubiszyn and Myślibórz.

References
Polish official population figures 2006

Nowogrodek Pomorski
Myślibórz County